ELKA, Elka, or Elkas may refer to:

 Aspioti-ELKA, Greek publishing and printing firm, active 1873–1997
 An Italian synthesizer manufacturer, now defunct; brand now owned by Generalmusic, used for their amplifier products
 Elka Synthex, a synthesizer produced from 1981–1985
 ELKA, a Bulgarian manufacturer of calculators
 Elka 22, the most famous model
 Elka (singer) (born 1982), Ukrainian singer
 Elka de Levie (1905–1979), Dutch gymnast
Elka Gilmore (1960–2019, American chef (of eponymous San Francisco restaurant Elka)
 Elka Graham (born 1981), Australian swimmer
 Elka Nikolova, Bulgarian-American film director
 Elka Ostrovsky, a fictional character from the TV show Hot in Cleveland
 Elka Todorova, Bulgarian sociology, psychology, and social work researcher
 Edward Elkas (fl. 1862–1926), American silent film actor
 Peter Elkas (born 1976), Canadian singer-songwriter